Presidential elections were held in Slovakia in March and April 2009, the country's third direct presidential elections. After no candidate received a majority of the vote in the first round on 21 March, the second round on 4 April saw Ivan Gašparovič become the first Slovak president to be re-elected, defeating opposition candidate Iveta Radičová by 55.53% to 44.47%.

First round
There were seven candidates for the first round, which was held on 21 March:
Ivan Gašparovič: incumbent president, supported by governing parties Direction – Social Democracy and Slovak National Party, and extra-parliamentary Movement for Democracy
Iveta Radičová: candidate of the Slovak Democratic and Christian Union – Democratic Party, supported by the Party of the Hungarian Coalition, Christian Democratic Movement and Civic Conservative Party
František Mikloško: candidate of the Conservative Democrats of Slovakia
Zuzana Martináková: candidate of the Free Forum
Milan Melník: independent candidate supported by the governing People's Party – Movement for a Democratic Slovakia
Milan Sidor: independent candidate supported by the Communist Party of Slovakia
Dagmara Bollová: independent candidate, former member of the Communist Party of Slovakia

Gašparovič and Radičová advanced to the second round, winning 46.7% and 38.1% of the first round votes, respectively. Slovak women tended to be more supportive of Radičová.

Second round
In the second round of elections, held on 4 April, Gašparovič received 1,234,787 votes (55.5%), winning election. Radičová received 44.5% of the vote. After the election, Gašparovič said, "I am glad I can be standing here today with the prime minister and the speaker of the parliament ... The [election] is the most direct evidence that people trust us."

Voter turnout
Voter turnout was 43.6% in the first round and 51.7% in the second round. Voter turnout among women slightly increased in both the first and second rounds of the election, which was attributed to Radičová's candidacy.

Results

Results by region

First round

Second round

References

External links
 NSD: European Election Database - Slovakia publishes regional level election data; allows for comparisons of election results, 1990-2010

Slovakia
Presidential elections in Slovakia
2009 in Slovakia
Slovakia
Slovakia